Kirsi Lampinen (born 19 January 1972) is a Finnish former professional tennis player.

Biography
Born in Turku, Lampinen competed on the professional tour in the late 1990s. She won two doubles titles on the ITF Women's Circuit, both partnering Fed Cup teammate Hanna-Katri Aalto.

Lampinen represented the Finland Fed Cup team in a total of 14 ties, between 1997 and 2001. She then served as team captain for Finland in 2002.

As of 2018 she coaches tennis full-time at the Rovaniemi Volleyball Club in Lapland.

ITF finals

Doubles (2–7)

References

External links
 
 
 

1972 births
Living people
Finnish female tennis players
Finnish tennis coaches
Sportspeople from Turku